Robert Hassell may refer to:

 Robert Hassell (baseball)
 Robert Hassell (sport shooter)
 Robert Hassell (swimmer)